Abusir Bana, anciently known as Busiris, is a village in Gharbia governorate, Egypt. The population is 22,214 people, according to the official census of 2006.

In antiquity, Busiris was the chief town of the Ati nome in Egypt. It stood east of Sais, near the Phatnitic mouth on the western bank of the Damietta Branch of the Nile. The city's pharaonic name was Djedu. The modern name is a compound, where the name of the nearby town Bana was added to differentiate it from other settlements of the same name spread around Egypt.

History 
The town and nome of Busiris were allotted to the Hermotybian division of the Egyptian militia. It was regarded as one of the birthplaces of the god of the underworld Osiris, who was commonly given the epithet lord of Djedu (nb ḏdw) and its name maybe etymologically linked.  The festival of Isis at Busiris came next in splendor and importance to that of Bastet at Bubastis in the Egyptian calendar. Considerable ruins are still extant.

The temple of Isis, indeed, with the hamlet which sprang up around it, stood probably at a short distance without the walls of Busiris itself, for Pliny (v. 10. s. 11) mentions Isidis oppidum in the neighbourhood of the town. The ruins of the temple are still visible, a little to the north of Abusir, at the hamlet of Bahheyt. (Pococke, Travels, vol. i. p. 34; Minutoli, p. 304.)It was in the Roman province of Aegyptus secundus.

After the Arab conquest of Egypt the city was known as Busir Samannud and it was the seat of a bishopric. The local Copts believed that it was named after one of the sorcerers of Pharaoh, whose name was Busir.

Ecclesiastical history 
Later, Busiris became a Christian bishopric. Extant documents provide the name of two of its early bishops: Hermaeon and Athanasius, the latter of whom took part in the Second Council of Ephesus in 449. In later centuries, from the 8th onward, the name of several of its non-Chalcedonian bishops are also known.

Titular see 
No longer a residential bishopric, Busiris is today listed by the Catholic Church as a titular see of the lowest (episcopal) rank.

The nominally revived diocese had the following near-consecutive incumbents:
 Alexander Chulaparambil (1914.07.16 – 1923.12.21)
 Celestino Annibale Cattaneo, Capuchin friars (O.F.M. Cap.) (later Archbishop) (1925.03.30 – 1936.03.03)
 Ignazio Arnoz, Mill Hill Missionaries (M.H.M.) (1937.04.13 – 1950.02.26)
 Johannes Albert von Rudloff (1950.04.08 – 1978.06.26)
 Theodor Kettmann, Auxiliary Bishop emeritus of Osnabrück (1978.11.27 – ... )

See also
 List of ancient Egyptian towns and cities

References

External links 
 GigaCatholic with titular incumbent biography links

Cities in ancient Egypt
Catholic titular sees in Africa
Ruins in Egypt
Former populated places in Egypt
Populated places in Gharbia Governorate